Aterpia sieversiana is a moth belonging to the family Tortricidae. The species was first described by J. H. Wilhelm von Nolcken in 1870.

It is native to Europe.

References

Olethreutini